Gelli may refer to:

People
Given name
Gelli de Belen (born 1973), Filipina actress and former child star
Gelli Meyrick (also Gelly or Gilly) (1556?–1601), Welsh supporter of Robert Devereux, 2nd Earl of Essex, and conspirator in Essex's rebellion

Surname
Cesare Gelli (1932–2016), Italian actor and voice actor
Chiaretta Gelli (1925–2007), Italian singer and film actress
Eduardo Gelli (1853–1933), Italian painter
Giambattista Gelli (1498–1563), Italian humanist
Licio Gelli (1919–2015), Italian fascist Freemason associated with the rogue Masonic lodge Propaganda Due or P2
Mario Gelli (born 1957), Italian long-distance runner
Ramesh Gelli, Indian bank executive

Places
Ardenis, Armenia, formerly Gelli
Gelli, Rhondda, a district in the Rhondda Valley, South Wales
Gelli, Pembrokeshire, a hamlet in Pembrokeshire, West Wales
Mynydd y Gelli, Welsh mountain
Gelli Formation, geologic formation in Wales
The Gelli, country house situated between Tallarn Green and Tybroughton in Wrexham County Borough, Wales
Gelli Bridge, two-arch bridge spanning the River Syfynwy a few yards before its confluence with the Eastern Cleddau, Wales
 Y Gelli, the Welsh name of Hay-on-Wye, Powys, Wales

See also
Gellis